Islamic Front may refer to:
Islamic Front (Syria), a merger of Syrian rebel groups
Syrian Islamic Front, former Syrian rebel group, replaced by the Islamic Front
Somali Islamic Front, another name for Jabhatul Islamiya, a Somali insurgent group